Gennady Provatorov (Проваторов, Геннадий Пантелеймонович) (Moscow, 11 March 1929 - Minsk 4 May 2010) was a Soviet and Belarusian conductor.

Gennady Provatorov was invited to Minsk when he was nearly 60 to work at the Minsk Philharmonic and National Opera and Ballet Theatre of Belarus. He was a Belarus State Award holder and a National Artist of RSFSR.

Discography
 Felix Blumenfeld - Symphony in C minor, Op 39 "To the Dear Beloved" . Vissarion Shebalin  Concertino for violin & orchestra Op14/1  Golovchin  1995
 Glazunov - Fantasy: The Sea, Op 28 - USSR TV and Radio Symphony Orchestra
 Valery Kikta - symphonies and variations - Gennady Rozhdestvensky, Gennady Provatorov, Alexander Korneev, and USSR TV and Radio Symphony Orchestra 1991
 Valery Kikta - Revelations, a ballet - Gennady Provatorov, conductor; Valeri Kastelsky, piano; Alexander Zumbrovsky, cello 1991
 Gavriil Popov -  Symphonies Nos. 1 & 2 Gennady Provatorov, and Moscow State Symphony Orchestra 1989
 Rachmaninov - Complete Piano Concerti 1, 2, 3 & 4 - Victor Eresco USSR Symphony Orchestra, and Gennady Provatorov (Audio CD - 1986)
 Shostakovich - Katerina Izmailova - Eleonora Andreyeva, Eduard Bulavin, and Vyacheslav Radzievsky.
 Tchaikovsky - The Oprichnik - Yevgeni Vladimirov, Tamara Milashkina, and Vladimir Matorin

References

1929 births
2010 deaths
Russian conductors (music)
Russian male conductors (music)
Belarusian conductors (music)